Gowrie Little Plain is a rural locality in the Toowoomba Region, Queensland, Australia.

Geography
Gowrie Little Plain is on the Darling Downs.

History 
The locality takes its name from the nearby town of Gowrie. The town takes its name from a pastoral run which was named pastoralists Henry Hughes and Frederick N. Isaac, who initially called the property Stanbrook, but renamed it Gowrie in 1847.  The name Gowrie is probably a corruption of cowarie, Aboriginal name for Gowrie Creek, which in turn possibly means freshwater mussel.

St Jude's Anglican church was dedicated on 20 July 1900 by Bishop William Webber. The church was on the main road overlooking the valley of Glencoe. It was built by L. P. Petersen. Its last service was held on 9 March 1951.

Education 
There are no schools in Gowrie Little Plain. The nearest primary school is in Kingsthorpe and Meringandan West. The nearest secondary schools are in Oakey and Highfields.

References

Further reading 

  — includes Gowrie Little Plains School, Aubigny School, Crosshill School, Devon Park State School, Silverleigh State School, Boodua School, Greenwood State School, Kelvinhaugh State School

Toowoomba Region
Localities in Queensland